Highline179 is located near Reutte on the Bavarian-Austrian Border, it extends at an altitude of  above the Ehrenberg castle and connects the Ehrenberg ruins with Fort Claudia.

Construction
The 1.20 m wide pedestrian bridge consists of a grating, which rests on crossbars, which are attached to the four supporting cables with a diameter of 60 mm each by means of vertical hangers. On both sides of the tread a 1.35 m high handrail is mounted, which is connected to the grate through a wire mesh lattice. The supporting ropes are fastened on both sides of the bridge with a total of 16 anchors which extend into the rock to a depth of 17 m. The weight of the bridge is about 70 tons.

One end of the bridge is 9.85 m higher than the other end. The bridge sags by 17 m in relation to an imaginary straight line between the two ends, and the sagging can increase by about one meter depending on the load and the temperature. The load bearing capacity is 1000 people, but for safety reasons only 500 people can be on the bridge at the same time, which is ensured by turnstiles at both ends. An entrance fee is charged for the use of the privately financed bridge, which is absorbed by the municipality in case of a minimum use.

History
In the spring of 2012, the planning of the Hängebrücke Ehrenberg was made after the building permit was granted. The goal was the construction of the world's longest rope-hanging bridge, with a length of about 406 meters. The idea came from Maximilian Huttenloher (1952-2009) and was built under architect Armin Walch, who was also involved in the planning of the Hängebrücke Holzgau.

At the beginning of 2013, an investor was found for the project. The market township of Reutte, the European Burmese Museum Ehrenberg and the TVB Nature Park Region of Reutte signed the contract as the basis for the construction and operation of the Hängebrücke.

Start of construction for the highline179 was in April 2014, and at the beginning of May the groundbreaking started. To protect the trunk road to be crossed, a protective scaffold with switchboards was installed over a length of 20 meters.

On October 29, 2014, the bridge was closed nine days after the last cable pull. The opening was scheduled for October 10, 2014 and was postponed to November 22, 2014 as a result of delays.

After a thorough examination, the highline179 was included in the Guinness Book of Records as the "longest pedestrian bridge in the Tibet style". The Guinness World Records Certificate confirmed "The longest Tibet-style footbridge is a catenary-shaped walkway" which brought the distinction to the now opened, approximately 440 m long bridge in the Skypark of Sochi, which is constructed differently with fixed walkways suspended under a tension belt.

References 

Suspension bridges
Bridges in Austria
Footbridges
Tourism in Austria